There is also Chippewa County and Chippewa Falls.

Chippewa is a town in Ashland County in the U.S. state of Wisconsin. The population was 374 at the 2010 census.

Geography

Demographics
As of the census of 2000, there were 433 people, 156 households, and 122 families residing in the town. The population density was 3.5 people per square mile (1.3/km2). There were 280 housing units at an average density of 2.3 per square mile (0.9/km2). The racial makeup of the town was 98.15% White, 0.92% African American, 0.69% Native American, and 0.23% from two or more races. Hispanic or Latino of any race were 0.23% of the population.

There were 156 households, out of which 28.8% had children under the age of 18 living with them, 69.2% were married couples living together, 5.1% had a female householder with no husband present, and 21.2% were non-families. 18.6% of all households were made up of individuals, and 11.5% had someone living alone who was 65 years of age or older. The average household size was 2.72 and the average family size was 3.10.

In the town, the population was spread out, with 27.9% under the age of 18, 3.9% from 18 to 24, 26.6% from 25 to 44, 23.8% from 45 to 64, and 17.8% who were 65 years of age or older. The median age was 40 years. For every 100 females, there were 107.2 males. For every 100 females age 18 and over, there were 113.7 males.

The median income for a household in the town was $42,159, and the median income for a family was $47,250. Males had a median income of $38,750 versus $19,167 for females. The per capita income for the town was $16,841. About 5.3% of families and 8.7% of the population were below the poverty line, including 9.1% of those under age 18 and 2.9% of those age 65 or over.

References

Towns in Ashland County, Wisconsin
Towns in Wisconsin